Okoya is a Nigerian surname. Notable people with the surname include:

Olajumoke Okoya-Thomas (born 1957), Nigerian politician
Molade Okoya-Thomas (1935–2015), Nigerian businessman
Razaq Okoya (born 1940), Nigerian businessman
Samuel Segun Okoya (born 1958), Professor of Mathematics